Tommaso William D'Orsogna (born 29 December 1990) is an Australian freestyle swimmer. He won a bronze medal at the 2012 Summer Olympics in the men's 4×100-metre medley relay. He also won gold in that event at the 2014 Commonwealth Games, in a Games record time. Individually, at those Commonwealth Games, he won the bronze medal in the 100 m freestyle.

Career Best Times
Long Course (50m Pool)
200m IM – 2:00.31 – 2009 World Championships
100m Freestyle – 48.41 – 2009 AIS Meet
200m Freestyle – 1:47.76 – 2013 Australian Championships
Short Course (25m Pool)
200m IM – 1:55.41 – 2010 World Short Course Championship
100m Freestyle – 46.13 – 2014 World Short Course Championship
200m Freestyle – 1:42.26 – 2009 Telstra Australian Short Course

See also
List of Commonwealth Games medallists in swimming (men)
List of Olympic medalists in swimming (men)

References

External links
 
 
 
 
 
 

1990 births
Living people
Australian male butterfly swimmers
Swimmers from Perth, Western Australia
Commonwealth Games gold medallists for Australia
Australian people of Italian descent
Australian male freestyle swimmers
World Aquatics Championships medalists in swimming
Olympic bronze medalists for Australia
Olympic bronze medalists in swimming
Olympic swimmers of Australia
Swimmers at the 2012 Summer Olympics
Medalists at the FINA World Swimming Championships (25 m)
Medalists at the 2012 Summer Olympics
Swimmers at the 2014 Commonwealth Games
Commonwealth Games medallists in swimming
21st-century Australian people
Medallists at the 2014 Commonwealth Games